The Chapin Sisters are an American folk rock and harmony duo from Brooklyn, New York. The band consists of sisters Abigail and Lily Chapin, and formerly their half-sister Jessica Craven. Their sound blurs the lines between old-time Appalachian music, classic country-rock and pop.

Early life 
Abigail and Lily were born in Brooklyn, New York, and grew up in the Hudson Valley. They sang professionally from an early age, first on their dad Tom Chapin's children's records, which led to jobs on other children's records, including the Olsen Twins' "Brother for Sale" and "I Am the Cute One". They also sang onstage in benefit and tribute concerts honoring their uncle, the late singer and activist Harry Chapin, along with other members of their family, including cousin Jen Chapin and their half-sister Jessica Craven.

By 2004 Abigail, Lily, and Jessica had relocated to Los Angeles (Lily Chapin was working on a film directed by Barbara Kopple). They began their band at the urging of their half-brother Jonathan Craven who arranged for them to record at the home studio of Michael Fitzpatrick (of the band Fitz and the Tantrums). Before they had ever played a show together or considered themselves a band, their slow, acoustic version of Britney Spears's song "Toxic" gained attention and radio play around the country. Following this unexpected success, The Chapin Sisters began to play concerts in Los Angeles, and the sisters also started writing music together—songs that would eventually become their first full-length album.

The Lake Bottom LP 
Spurred by the sudden interest in their singing abilities, they put together a collection of songs and, on March 18, 2008, they released their debut full-length album Lake Bottom LP on the Plain Recordings label. Initially the album was only released as a vinyl record but a compact disc version soon followed.

Many of the music reviews by critics were positive. According to popmatters.com, "they haunt the interstices of folk, pop, and blues, and play seductive games with the knife-edge of heartache. Their soft harmonies and dark sidelong lyrics fit perfectly into a new folk aesthetic that is more twisted than freaky," and "their music blends the harmonies of traditional sister-acts with a modern lyrical sensibility." FLAVORPILL of San Francisco wrote "The one virtue the Chapin Sisters shares with classic sister acts of old becomes apparent when they sing together: that shiver of spotless, familial unity that makes every syllable woundingly poignant."

2010, the departure of Jessica, and Two 
In early 2010 Jessica took a "leave of absence" and left the band to spend time with her newborn baby, and Lily and Abigail, now a duo, set out on tour with the folk pop duo She & Him (consisting of M. Ward and actress Zooey Deschanel) singing back-up vocals and opening many of the shows as well.

In April 2010 The Chapin Sisters released a five-song EP called "Oh Hear the Wind Blow," which was recorded live in the studio with Dan Horne as engineer and bass player, and Aaron Sperske on drums.

On September 14, 2010, Abigail and Lily released their second full-length album "Two" on their own label, Lake Bottom Records. The album was produced by the sisters, along with Louie Stephens of Rooney and Jesse Lee of Gang Gang Dance.

A Date with the Everly Brothers 
On April 23, 2013, A Date With the Everly Brothers was released as a full-length album tribute to The Everly Brothers. It was funded via a successful Kickstarter campaign that ended up raising over 150% of the band's goal.

Today's Not Yesterday 
In October 2015, the band announced on their website and via Kickstarter that they would release their full-length album titled Today's Not Yesterday, composed of original songs. The 12-song album was recorded in Los Angeles at Jonathan Wilson's Five-Star studio with the help of producers Dan Horne and Jesse Lee.

Discography

Studio records

Featured appearances

References

External links 
 Official website
 NPR interview with Scott Simon

American folk musical groups
Folk rock duos
Female musical duos
Sibling musical duos
Musical groups from Brooklyn
Musical groups established in 2004
2004 establishments in California
Folk rock groups from California
Red Rockets Glare artists